The Bolshaya Martayka is a river in Perm Krai, Russia, a left tributary of Vels which in turn is a tributary of Vishera. Its source is near the border with Sverdlovsk Oblast, and it flows through the Vishersky Nature Reserve.

References 

Rivers of Perm Krai